Styggforsen is a waterfall and a nature reserve in Dalarna County, Sweden. It is part of the European Union-wide Natura 2000 network.

Geography
The waterfall is located in the village of Boda, 20 kilometres to the north of Rättvik. It lies at the eastern edge of the Siljan Ring, a prehistoric impact crater which was formed 377 million years ago during the Devonian period when a meteorite struck the Earth's surface. The bolide was estimated to be about 4 kilometres in diameter and was travelling at around 100,000 kilometres per hour, causing a vertical realignment of the  horizontal rock strata and a depression of the bedrock upon collision. This had a profound effect upon the local environment, creating many of the geological features which exist to this day such as Lake Siljan to the south-west and Styggforsen.

The river Styggforsån is interrupted by the waterfall which is 36 meters high and composed of a column of Ordovician limestone. The base of the waterfall abuts a dike of brecciated quartz which is believed to predate the impact event. The site is popular with tourists and it is encompassed by a circular path of about one kilometre that leads down to a cave called Troll Hole. A cafe is open during the summer time and there is also an information centre nearby.

Flora and fauna
In 1979, a nature reserve approximately 12 hectares in size was established around the waterfall, and in 2005 it was incorporated into the Natura 2000 network. Its moist climate is favoured by many lichens, mosses and plants, such as the rare orchid Epipactis atrorubens which grows there. It also provides a habitat for many species of insects which include Venusia cambrica, Hyloicus pinastri and Epirrhoe alternata. Picking flowers and doing anything to affect the environment is forbidden within the confines of the nature reserve.

Trivia
Ingmar Bergman's film, The Virgin Spring, used Styggforsen as one of its locations.

References 

Waterfalls of Sweden
Landforms of Dalarna County
Nature reserves in Sweden
Natura 2000 in Sweden
1979 establishments in Sweden